, better known by the pen name  was a Japanese author and critic who played a major role in the development of Japanese mystery and thriller fiction.

Ranpo was an admirer of Western mystery writers, and especially of Edgar Allan Poe.  His pen name is a rendering of Poe's name.  Other authors who were special influences on him were Sir Arthur Conan Doyle, whom he attempted to translate into Japanese during his days as a student at Waseda University, and the Japanese mystery writer Ruikō Kuroiwa.

Biography

Before World War II
Tarō Hirai was born in Nabari, Mie Prefecture in 1894, where his grandfather had been a samurai in the service of Tsu Domain. His father was a merchant, who had also practiced law. The family moved to what is now Kameyama, Mie, and from there to Nagoya when he was age two. At the age of 17, he studied economics at Waseda University in Tokyo starting in 1912. After graduating in 1916 with a degree in economics, he worked a series of odd jobs, including newspaper editing, drawing cartoons for magazine publications, selling soba noodles as a street vendor, and working in a used bookstore.

In 1923, he made his literary debut by publishing the mystery story  under the pen name "Edogawa Ranpo" (pronounced quickly, this humorous pseudonym sounds much like the name of the American pioneer of detective fiction, Edgar Allan Poe, whom he admired). The story appeared in the magazine Shin Seinen, a popular magazine written largely for an adolescent audience. Shin Seinen had previously published stories by a variety of Western authors including Poe, Arthur Conan Doyle, and G. K. Chesterton, but this was the first time the magazine published a major piece of mystery fiction by a Japanese author. Some, such as James B. Harris (Ranpo's first translator into English), have erroneously called this the first piece of modern mystery fiction by a Japanese writer, but well before Ranpo entered the literary scene in 1923, a number of other modern Japanese authors such as Ruikō Kuroiwa, Kidō Okamoto, Jun'ichirō Tanizaki, Haruo Satō, and Kaita Murayama had incorporated elements of sleuthing, mystery, and crime within stories involving adventure, intrigue, the bizarre, and the grotesque. What struck critics as new about Ranpo’s debut story "The Two-Sen Copper Coin" was that it focused on the logical process of ratiocination used to solve a mystery within a story that is closely related to Japanese culture. The story involves an extensive description of an ingenious code based on a Buddhist chant known as the "nenbutsu" as well as Japanese-language Braille.

Over the course of the next several years, Edogawa went on to write a number of other stories that focus on crimes and the processes involved in solving them. Mirrors, lenses, and other optical devices appear in many of Edogawa's other early stories, such as "The Hell of Mirrors".

Although many of his first stories were primarily about sleuthing and the processes used in solving seemingly insolvable crimes, during the 1930s, he began to turn increasingly to stories that involved a combination of sensibilities often called "ero guro nansensu", from the three words "eroticism, grotesquerie, and the nonsensical". The presence of these sensibilities helped him sell his stories to the public, which was increasingly eager to read his work. One finds in these stories a frequent tendency to incorporate elements of what the Japanese at that time called . For instance, a major portion of the plot of the novel , serialized from January 1929 to February 1930 in the journal , involves a homosexual doctor and his infatuation for another main character.

By the 1930s, Edogawa was writing regularly for a number of major public journals of popular literature, and he had emerged as the foremost voice of Japanese mystery fiction. (A number of these novels were subsequently made into films.) These works were wildly popular and are still read by many young Japanese readers, much like the Hardy Boys or Nancy Drew mysteries are popular mysteries for adolescents in the English-speaking world.

During World War II

In 1939, two years after the Marco Polo Bridge Incident and the outbreak of the Second Sino-Japanese War in 1937, Edogawa was ordered by government censors to drop his story , which he had published without incident a few years before, from a collection of his short stories that the publisher Shun'yōdō was reprinting. "The Caterpillar" is about a veteran who was turned into a quadriplegic and so disfigured by war that he was little more than a human "caterpillar", unable to talk, move, or live by himself. Censors banned the story, apparently believing that the story would detract from the current war effort. This came as a blow to Ranpo, who relied on royalties from reprints for income. (The short story inspired director Kōji Wakamatsu, who drew from it his movie Caterpillar, which competed for the Golden Bear at the 60th Berlin International Film Festival.)

Over the course of World War II, especially during the full-fledged war between Japan and the US that began in 1941, Edogawa was active in his local neighborhood organization, and he wrote a number of stories about young detectives and sleuths that might be seen as in line with the war effort, but he wrote most of these under different pseudonyms as if to disassociate them with his legacy. In February 1945, his family was evacuated from their home in Ikebukuro, Tokyo to Fukushima in northern Japan. Edogawa remained until June, when he was suffering from malnutrition. Much of Ikebukuro was destroyed in Allied air raids and the subsequent fires that broke out in the city, but the thick, earthen-walled warehouse which he used as his studio was spared, and still stands to this day beside the campus of Rikkyo University.

Postwar
In the postwar period, Edogawa dedicated a great deal of energy to promoting mystery fiction, both in terms of the understanding of its history and encouraging the production of new mystery fiction. In addition, he wrote a large number of articles about the history of Japanese, European, and American mystery fiction. Many of these essays were published in book form. Other than essays, much of his postwar literary production consisted largely of novels for juvenile readers featuring Kogorō Akechi and the Boy Detectives Club.

In the 1950s, he and a bilingual translator collaborated for five years on a translation of Edogawa's works into English, published as Japanese Tales of Mystery and Imagination by Tuttle. Since the translator could speak but not read Japanese, and Edogawa could read but not write English, the translation was done aurally, with Edogawa reading each sentence aloud, then checking the written English.

Another of his interests, especially during the late 1940s and 1950s, was bringing attention to the work of his dear friend Jun'ichi Iwata (1900–1945), an anthropologist who had spent many years researching the history of homosexuality in Japan. During the 1930s, Edogawa and Iwata had engaged in a light-hearted competition to see who could find the most books about erotic desire between men. Edogawa dedicated himself to finding books published in the West and Iwata dedicated himself to finding books having to do with Japan. Iwata died in 1945, with only part of his work published, so Edogawa worked to have the remaining work on queer historiography published.

In the postwar period, a large number of Edogawa's books were made into films. The interest in using Edogawa's literature as a departure point for creating films has continued well after his death. Edogawa, who suffered from a variety of health issues, including atherosclerosis and Parkinson's disease, died from a cerebral hemorrhage at his home in 1965. His grave is at the Tama Cemetery in Fuchu, near Tokyo.

The Edogawa Rampo Prize (江戸川乱歩賞 Edogawa Ranpo Shō?), named after Edogawa Rampo, is a Japanese literary award which has been presented every year by the Mystery Writers of Japan since 1955. The winner is given a prize of ¥10 million with publication rights by Kodansha.

Works in English translation
Books
 Edogawa Rampo (1956), Japanese Tales of Mystery and Imagination, translated by James B. Harris. 14th ed. Rutland, VT: Charles E. Tuttle Company. .
 Edogawa Ranpo (1988), The Boy Detectives Club, translated by Gavin Frew. Tokyo: Kodansha. .
 Edogawa Rampo (2006), The Black Lizard and Beast in the Shadows, translated by Ian Hughes.  Fukuoka: Kurodahan Press. .
 Edogawa Rampo (2008), The Edogawa Rampo Reader, translated by Seth Jacobowitz.  Fukuoka: Kurodahan Press. .  Contains many of Rampo's early short stories and essays.
 Edogawa Rampo (2009), Moju: The Blind Beast, translated by Anthony Whyte.  Shinbaku Books. .
 Edogawa Rampo (2012), The Fiend with Twenty Faces, translated by Dan Luffey. Fukuoka: Kurodahan Press. .
 Edogawa Ranpo (2013), Strange Tale of Panorama Island, translated by Elaine Kazu Gerbert. Honolulu: University of Hawaiʻi Press. .
 Edogawa Rampo (2014), The Early Cases of Akechi Kogoro, translated by William Varteresian. Fukuoka: Kurodahan Press. .
 Edogawa Rampo (2019), Gold Mask, translated by William Varteresian. Fukuoka: Kurodahan Press. .

Short stories
 Edogawa Ranpo (2008), "The Two-Sen Copper Coin," translated by Jeffrey Angles, Modanizumu: Modernist Fiction from Japan, 1913–1938, ed. William Tyler. Honolulu: University of Hawai'i Press.  .  pp. 270–89.
 Edogawa Ranpo (2008), "The Man Traveling with the Brocade Portrait," translated by Michael Tangeman, Modanizumu: Modernist Fiction from Japan, 1913–1938, ed. William Tyler. Honolulu: University of Hawai'i Press.  .  pp. 376–393.
 Edogawa Ranpo (2008), "The Caterpillar," translated by Michael Tangeman, Modanizumu: Modernist Fiction from Japan, 1913–1938, ed. William Tyler. Honolulu: University of Hawai'i Press.  .  pp. 406–422.

Major works

Private Detective Kogoro Akechi series

Short stories

Novels

Juvenile novels

Standalone mystery novels and novellas
Available in English translation

Novels and novellas which have not been translated into English

Short stories
Available in English translation

 Short stories which have not been translated into English

Adaptations of Western mystery novels
 Adaptation of The Red Redmaynes by Eden Phillpotts
 Adaptation of The Hanged Man of Saint-Pholien by Georges Simenon
 Adaptation of Murder among the Angells by Roger Scarlett

Essays
"The Horrors of Film" (1925)
"Spectral Voices" (1926)
"Confessions of Rampo" (1926)
"The Phantom Lord" (1935) 
"A Fascination with Lenses" (1936)
"My Love for the Printed Word" (1936)
"Fingerprint Novels of the Meiji Era" (1950)
"Dickens vs. Poe" (1951)
"A Desire for Transformation" (1953)
"An Eccentric Idea" (1954)

These ten essays are included in The Edogawa Rampo Reader.

In popular culture

Director Teruo Ishii's Horrors of Malformed Men from 1969 incorporates plot elements from a number of Ranpo stories. Noboru Tanaka filmed Watcher in the Attic as part of Nikkatsu's Roman porno series in 1976.
The manga group CLAMP used Edogawa as one of the inspirations for the series Man of Many Faces (1990–1991).
Akio Jissoji's films Watcher in the Attic (1992) and Murder on D Street (1998) are both adaptations of Ranpo's works.  In both these movies Kogorō Akechi is played by actor Kyūsaku Shimada.
In 1994, a film entitled Rampo inspired by Ranpo's works was released in Japan (The film was retitled The Mystery of Rampo for its American release).  Ranpo himself is the lead character of the film and is portrayed by actor Naoto Takenaka.
The 1999 film Gemini by Shinya Tsukamoto is based on an Edogawa Ranpo story.
Some of Ranpo's stories were later turned into short films in the 2005 compilation Rampo Noir, starring the well-known actor Tadanobu Asano.
Barbet Schroeder's 2008 film Inju: The Beast in the Shadow is an adaptation of Ranpo's 1928 short story.
The horror manga artist Suehiro Maruo has adapted two of Ranpo's stories: The Strange Tale of the Panorama Island (2008) and "The Caterpillar" (2009).
In 2009 the Japanese Google homepage displayed a logo commemorating his birthday on October 21.
The manga and anime series Detective Conan (Meitantei Conan) has the main character's alias as 'Edogawa Conan', created from Sir Arthur Conan Doyle and Edogawa Ranpo's names. The detective that he lives with is called Mouri Kogoro, and Conan is part of a children's detective group called the Detective Boys (Shonen Tantei Dan); all apparent homages to the late Ranpo.
The video game Persona 5 has a detective character named Akechi Goro, which is a reference to Ranpo's character Akechi Kogoro.
The anime and manga Bungo Stray Dogs has a character named Edogawa Ranpo, who is incredibly talented at solving crimes the police have trouble with and other mysteries. He claims to have a skill called "Super Deduction", but in reality, he is one of the few members of the Armed Detective Agency not to have a special ability.
The last two episodes (10 and 11) of the 2013 Fuji Television (フジテレビ）series, Biblia Koshodō no Jiken Techō (ビブリア古書堂の事件手帖 Antiquarian Bookseller Biblia’s Case Files), are constructed around two Edogawa Ranpo works, Boys Detective Club and The Man Traveling with the Brocade Portrait (translated as “The Traveler with the Pasted Rag Picture”).
The online game Bungou to Alchemist featured Ranpo as one of the writers the player can get. In the game, he is portrayed as an eccentric man who hates mainstream things and enjoys creating new tricks, non-malicious pranks, and ways to defeat the enemy.
The 2015 anime Rampo Kitan: Game of Laplace was inspired by the works of Edogawa and commemorates the 50th anniversary of his death.
The 2016 anime "Trickster: From Edogawa Ranpo's "The Boy Detectives Club" takes Ranpo's characters and sets them in the 2030s. An unusual twist is that Kobayashi is not a boy detective, but instead a character with a supernatural power that keeps him from being killed or dying - but that also keeps him isolated and longing for death.
The Japanese heavy metal band Ningen Isu is named after the short story of the same name.
Several of his works have been adapted or expanded upon by manga artist Junji Ito, including “The Human Chair” and “An Unearthly Love”.
The 2021 video game Lost Judgment features a 'detective dog' named after the author. In the game, Ranpo is an intelligent Shiba Inu who finds clues by smell.

See also

Japanese literature
Japanese detective fiction
Japanese horror
Mystery Writers of Japan
Edogawa Rampo Prize
Detective Conan

References

Secondary sources
 Leigh Blackmore "Edogawa Rampo and The Red Chamber". Essay (liner notes) in Edogawa Rampo, The Red Chamber, vinyl LP, Cadabra Records (2022).
 Angles, Jeffrey (2011), Writing the Love of Boys: Origins of Bishōnen Culture in Modernist Japanese Literature. Minneapolis: University of Minnesota Press. .
 Jacobowitz, Seth (2008), Introduction to The Edogawa Rampo Reader. Fukuoka: Kurodahan Press. .
 Kawana, Sari (2008), Murder Most Modern: Detective Fiction and Japanese Culture. Minneapolis: University of Minnesota Press.  .
 Silver, Mark (2008), Purloined Letters: Cultural Borrowing and Japanese Crime Literature, 1868-1937. Honolulu: University of Hawai'i Press. .

External links

Edogawa Ranpo at  The Encyclopedia of Science Fiction

1894 births
1965 deaths
Japanese literary critics
Japanese mystery writers
Japanese detective fiction writers
Japanese crime fiction writers
20th-century Japanese novelists
Mystery Writers of Japan Award winners
Writers from Mie Prefecture
Edgar Allan Poe
Weird fiction writers
19th-century pseudonymous writers
20th-century pseudonymous writers